Koksijde is a town and a municipality in Belgium. It is located on the North Sea coast in the southwest of the Flemish province of West Flanders.

The municipality comprises apart from Koksijde, the villages of Oostduinkerke, Saint-Idesbald and Wulpen.

On 1 January 2018, Koksijde municipality had a total population of 21,957 on a total area of 43.96 km² (17 sq mi), which gives a population density of 499 inhabitants per km² (1251/sq mi).

Since 1995 Marc Vanden Bussche has been mayor of Koksijde.

Municipality
The municipality of Koksijde comprises the "deelgemeenten" Koksijde, Oostduinkerke, Saint-Idesbald and Wulpen.

The old town centre of Koksijde is located about two kilometres from the shoreline. Close by the sea, a new tourist centre, Koksijde-bad, has developed. A bit to the west on the territory is the hamlet of Saint-Idesbald. The old town centre of Oostduinkerke is located more than one kilometre from the coastline as well, with Oostduinkerke-bad close to the sea. Over four kilometres inland is the rural polder village of Wulpen.

Koksijde borders the following villages and municipalities:
a. Nieuwpoort (city)
b. Ramskapelle (Nieuwpoort)
c. Booitshoeke (Veurne)
d. Veurne (city)
e. Adinkerke (municipality De Panne)
f. De Panne (municipality)

Tourism
The museum of the historical Ten Duinen Abbey is set in a modern building, explaining the religious and cultural importance of this abbey throughout history and showing the daily life of Cistercian monks from the early Middle Ages, beginning in 1107 till the death of the last monk in 1833. The archaeological site has been restored, and is open to the public. The attic of the museum contains a remarkable collection of liturgical silverware.

The British Military Cemetery (1940–1945) bears witness to British sacrifices in the Battle of Dunkirk.

The Paul Delvaux Museum in Saint-Idesbald houses the world's largest collection of works by the Belgian painter Paul Delvaux.

Sports
The annual Duinencross Koksijde cyclo-cross race, part of the UCI Cyclo-cross World Cup, takes place in the municipality. In 1994 and 2012 the UCI Cyclo-cross World Championships were held here.

Koksijde operates the Koksijde Golf ter Hille golf club.

Gallery

See also
Koksijde Air Base

Sister cities 
  Albina and Galibi, Suriname.

References

External links

Official website  - Information available in Dutch and limited information available in French, English and German

 
Municipalities of West Flanders